TSE Services (Total Sports Entertainment, Total Sports Services) is a sports entertainment and game software company. TSE offers sports franchise consulting, A/V production and equipment integration, and game operations and sponsorship sales systems management software.

TSE's equipment division provides audio/video production systems design and integration. TSE's Management Solutions division provides event management technology including TSE GameTime ScriptPRO, a game management solution for building and executing event scripts and schedules, and SponsorPRO, a sponsorship sales automation system used to organize, execute, and track sponsorship inventory. TSE has sold its services to teams such as the Binghamton Mets as well as the Wilmington Blue Rocks.

Management Systems Division

In March 2011, TSE upgraded the company's technology platform with the implementation of CoSentry's secure cloud computing network.

TSE GameTime ScriptPRO

GameTime ScriptPRO is a patented internet based event management software program used by teams and schools of all levels to streamline events, produce scripts, and generate reports. The customizable interface allows users to build their accounts based on their specific needs. ScriptPRO is designed to prevent scripting errors, save time building event schedules, and enhance the efficiency of the production as a whole. The multi-user system allows real time changes to be viewed system wide. The changes can be made on any device with an internet connection including smart phones. Since 2007 over 40,000 games have been produced by ScriptPRO.

Current GameTime users include: San Francisco Giants, Denver Broncos, Miami Heat, and Vancouver Canucks.

TSE GameTime SponsorPRO

In October 2010, TSE released a new addition to GameTime. It is an internet-based tool for organizing, tracking and validating all sponsored inventory.

Equipment Solutions - AV Design and Integration

TSE provides equipment, installation and support for a facility. Video Boards, Video Equipment, Sound Systems, Security Systems. TSE Design-build new audio and video productions or retrofit existing systems/facilities throughout North America. Recent clients include: Pensacola Blue Wahoos, Colorado Springs Sky Sox and West Michigan Whitecaps.

Recent Projects

Consulting Services Division - Fan Experience Enhancement, Creative Services and Event Production

Total Sports Entertainment’s Consulting Services Division offers expertise and guidance from former executives in the sports and entertainment industries. Services include: Content Creation for video displays, Video Board Design and Sourcing, Seminars and Training, Staffing and Recruitment/Head Hunting, among others. TSE is also known for supporting teams in the opening of new franchises, ballparks and new facility renovations.

List of Recent TSE Partners and Franchise Openings

History
In 1984 childhood friends (Bobby Blues) Bob Masewicz and Bill La Rue were dared to enter a talent competition at Big Al's restaurant and Bar in La Crosse, WI.

Sensing the high demand for entertainers in sports venues during the early 1990s, Bob and Bill founded B&B entertainment (now Total Sports Entertainment). The agency focused on providing sports entertainers to companies worldwide. 
 
At the start of the new millennium, Bob Masewicz developed Total Sports Entertainment. In 2002, Bob joined the Altoona Curve Baseball baseball team as their Director of Entertainment/Promotions.

TSE GameTime ScriptPRO was developed and first released in 2006. The TSE suite of software for the event management sector has grown to include a CRM integrated directly to ScriptPRO. SponsorPRO is designed to assist a staff in selling and managing their inventory of sponsorships.

References

Companies based in Wisconsin